The Best of JT Money & Poison Clan is a compilation album released by Luke Records containing the greatest hits from the group, Poison Clan. The album managed to make it to #82 on the Top R&B/Hip-Hop Albums.

Track listing
"Low Life Mutha Fuckas"- 4:45
"In My Nature"- 4:30
"The Bitch That I Hate"- 4:34
"Groove With the Poison Clan"- 3:54
"Shake Whatcha Mama Gave Ya"- 3:22
"Dance All Night"- 4:57
"Put Shit Past No Ho"- 4:12
"Fakin' Like Gangsters"- 3:52
"Action"- 4:17
"I Hate Hoes"- 3:14
"Poison Freestyle"- 5:17
"Check Out the Ave., Pt. 1"- 3:18
"Check Out the Ave., Pt. 2"- 3:00
"Head Head & More Head, Pt. 1"- 4:20
"Head Head & More Head, Pt. 2"- 4:31
"Get It Girl"- 6:01
"Pick It Up"- 3:01
"Dance All Night"- 4:55
"Throw the P"- 3:09
"Shake Whatcha Mama Gave Ya"- 3:11
"You Go Girl"- 3:58
"Everybody Say Yeah"- 4:14
"Wiggle Wiggle"- 3:47
"Jealous Girls"- 3:56
" Nasty Bitch"- 6:36
"Sheryl & Donna"- 3:14
"Mega Mixx"- 10:40

Poison Clan albums
1999 greatest hits albums
Luke Records compilation albums